Étang de Peyregrand is a lake in Ariège, France.

Peyregrand